Qaleh-ye Ahmad (also Romanized as Qal‘eh-ye Aḩmad) is a village in Beyarjomand Rural District, Beyarjomand District, Shahrud County, Semnan Province, Iran. At the 2006 census, its population was 56, in 19 families.

References 

Populated places in Shahrud County